"The Understudy" is the tenth episode of the fifth and final season of the period drama Upstairs, Downstairs. It first aired on 9 November 1975 on ITV.

Background
"The Understudy" was recorded in the studio on 10 and 11 July 1975. Shortly before this episode aired, an episode of Carry On Laughing called "And In My Lady's Chamber" was broadcast. This was a spoof of Upstairs, Downstairs with Joan Sims as Mrs Breeches and Jack Douglas as Clodson, and the Bellamys became the Pellamys.  Three weeks later, another Carry On Laughing episode used the same characters in the episode "Who Needs Kitchener?", a spoof of the fourth series of Upstairs, Downstairs. After "The Understudy" had been filmed, the main cast of Upstairs, Downstairs filmed the Christmas documentary Russell Harty Goes...Upstairs, Downstairs, which was aired on Boxing Day 1975.

Cast
Gordon Jackson - Hudson
David Langton - Richard Bellamy
Simon Williams - James Bellamy
Lesley-Anne Down - Georgina Worsley
Jean Marsh - Rose
Angela Baddeley - Mrs Bridges
Christopher Beeny - Edward
Gareth Hunt - Frederick
Jenny Tomasin - Ruby
Jacqueline Tong - Daisy
Anthony Woodruff - Dr. Foley
Andre Charisse - M. Fleuriau
Barbara Bolton - Madamae Fleuriau
Natalie Caron - Simone Fleauriau
Philip Webb - Lord Swanbourne  
Lorna Kilner - Lady Swanbourne 
Roy Knight - Ambulance Man 
David Nicholl - Ambulance Man

Plot
It is September 1926 and Richard is having the French Ambassador, M. Fleariau, and his wife and daughter to dinner. Virginia is in Scotland and can not return as she has a bad fever. Georgina offers to cancel her sailing weekend to act as host, and she persuades James to cancel his day of polo to give her support.

On the evening of the dinner, Hudson collapses and Dr. Foley is sent for instantly. Dr. Foley confirms that Hudson had a mild heart attack. A debate then starts downstairs as to who will take Hudson's place that evening as butler, with Daisy heavily pushing for her husband Edward, but Frederick believing it should be himself. Upstairs, although James favours Frederick, Georgina and Richard go for Edward, who performs his duties as butler very well. However, he nearly makes one error when he forgets to decant the claret, but Frederick reminds him to do so.

Dr. Foley says that Hudson needs a couple of months to recoperate, and it is arranged for him to go and stay with Mr and Mrs. Tranter, a couple who live down on the Southwold estate. Once again, they argue upstairs as to who should act as butler while Hudson is away. James favours Frederick, but Richard, Georgina and Virginia (via the telephone) all favour Edward, and he is chosen. Before he goes, Hudson tells Mrs. Bridges that he has left everything he has to her should he die, and Mrs. Bridges says she has done the same for him. As he leaves, Mrs Bridges cries.

Footnotes

References
Richard Marson, "Inside UpDown - The Story of Upstairs, Downstairs", Kaleidoscope Publishing, 2005
Updown.org.uk - Upstairs, Downstairs Fansite

Upstairs, Downstairs (series 5) episodes
1975 British television episodes
Fiction set in 1926